El Almendro can refer to:
El Almendro, a rural municipality in the Río San Juan department of Nicaragua
El Almendro, Huelva, Spain